Alice Gwendoline Rhona Haszard (1901–1931) was a New Zealand artist.

Biography

Haszard was born in Thames, New Zealand, one of the five children of Alice (née Wily), and Henry Douglas Morpeth Haszard, a surveyor, who worked for the Lands and Survey Department, later becoming a Commissioner of Crown Lands in 1910. As a result of her father's job the family moved often and lived in Auckland, Christchurch, Hokitika and Invercargill.

At the age of 18, Haszard enrolled at the Canterbury College School of Art, now the Ilam School of Fine Arts, joining a set of women artists that included Ngaio Marsh, Evelyn Page (née Polson), Rata Lovell-Smith (née Bird) and Olivia Spencer Bower. She was taught amongst others by Archibald Nicoll, the newly appointed head of the school.

Haszard was very bohemian. She dressed eccentrically, spoke positively of de facto relationships and  advocated vegetarianism and unprocessed food.

In 1922, she married Ronald McKenzie, a teacher and fellow student. However, in 1925, she abandoned this marriage to run off with an ex-British Army officer Leslie Greener. After being confronted with society disapproval, the couple escaped to France in 1926. They settled in Paris and studied briefly at the Académie Julian. Haszard continued to paint landscapes and exhibited in Paris at the Paris Salon and, during 1927, in London with the Society of Women Artists and in Cairo as well as sending work back to be exhibited in New Zealand.

The couple completed numerous painting trips to the Channel Islands, Cyprus and Greece. In 1927, Greener was employed by Victoria College, Alexandria, Egypt to teach art. In 1928 Haszard had a serious accident that left her with a back injury and she returned to London to seek medical treatment in 1929 and 1930. However she remained committed to painting and to the bohemian art and theatre circles. She returned to Alexandria in 1930. She was killed when she fell off a four-storey tower at Victoria College, Alexandria in 1931 the night after her last exhibition opened. She was 30.

List of works
Works from the collection of the Museum of New Zealand Te Papa Tongarewa

References

External links
 Haszard, Alice Gwendoline Rhona -  Biography at the Dictionary of New Zealand Biography. Te Ara - the Encyclopedia of New Zealand by Anne Kirker

1901 births
1931 deaths
20th-century New Zealand painters
20th-century New Zealand women artists
Ilam School of Fine Arts alumni
People from Thames, New Zealand
People educated at Southland Girls' High School
New Zealand women painters
Deaths from falls